ROHM Theatre Kyoto, originally known as Kyoto Kaikan, is a concert hall and performance venue located in Kyoto, Japan. The main hall was first opened in 1960 and seated 2,005 patrons. The facility closed in 2012 and was redeveloped over a four-year period, reopening in January 2016.  As well as the main concert hall, the facility also has two additional performance spaces seating 700 and 200 guests.

Kyoto-based ROHM semiconductor saved the landmark post-modernist building from possible demolition by granting ¥5.25 billion towards the cost of refurbishment. In recognition of this contribution, ROHM received naming rights to the building.

See also
List of concert halls
Kyoto Concert Hall

References

External links 

 
 Heritage Alert ICOMOS International Scientific Committiee on Twentieth Century Heritage
 Reply City of Kyoto

Concert halls in Japan
Buildings and structures in Kyoto
Tourist attractions in Kyoto
Kunio Maekawa buildings
Music venues completed in 1960
1960 establishments in Japan